Tomás Moulian Emparanza (born 21 September 1939) is a Chilean political scientist and sociologist. A Guggenheim Fellow and winner of the National Prize for Humanities and Social Sciences, he is known for being a critic of the socio-economic structure of his country after the dictatorship of Augusto Pinochet.

Biography
The brother of historian , and uncle of businessman , Tomás Moulian studied sociology at the Pontifical Catholic University of Chile (PUC), and did postgraduate studies at the University of Louvain (UCLouvain) in Belgium and Paris.

He was director of the sociology schools of his alma mater and of University ARCIS. At the latter he also served as Vice Chancellor for Research, and Rector from 2003 to 2006. He was deputy director of the Latin American Social Sciences Institute (FLACSO) in Chile (1990–1991), where he also taught from 1974 to 1994. He has been director of the Paulo Freire Institute of Social Training.

After the return of democracy he identified himself as an independent close to the Communist Party of Chile (PCCh). This same party proclaimed him presidential candidate for the 2005 election, where he finally yielded his selection to the humanist Tomás Hirsch.

Thought

Moulian's works of historical interpretation of the 20th century have been very influential, despite not having the training of a historian. He has published works on the Popular Front, Popular Unity, and political projects of the right. In the same way, his reflections on the process experienced after the end of the Pinochet dictatorship have become prominent.

His 1997 essay Chile actual: anatomía de un mito – which won the Santiago Municipal Literature Award the following year and which has had several subsequent editions – is well-known. In this he unveiled the "transvestism" of the political sectors that led the transition towards democracy, who would have allowed the fundamental pillars of the fallen regime to remain.

Works
 Discusiones entre honorables: las candidaturas presidenciales de la derecha entre 1938 y 1946, Santiago: FLACSO, 1987 (together with )
 La forja de ilusiones: El sistema de partidos, 1932-1973, FLACSO, 1993, 
 Crisis de los saberes y espacio universitario, 1995
 Chile actual: anatomía de un mito, Santiago: LOM Ediciones, 1997, 
 Conversación interrumpida con Allende, Universidad ARCIS, 1998, 
 El consumo me consume, Santiago: LOM Ediciones, 1999, 
 Socialismo del siglo XXI: La quinta via, Santiago: LOM Ediciones, 2000, 
 Ein Sozialismus für das 21. Jahrhundert, Zürich: Rotpunktverlag, 2003, 
 En la brecha. Derechos humanos, críticas y alternativas, Santiago: LOM Ediciones, 2002, 
 De la política letrada a la política analfabeta, Santiago: LOM Ediciones, 2004, 
 Fracturas: de Pedro Aguirre Cerda a Salvador Allende (1938-1973), Santiago: LOM Ediciones, 2006, 
 Contradicciones del desarrollo político chileno, 1920-1990, Santiago de Chile: LOM Ediciones, 2009,

References

1939 births
20th-century Chilean historians
20th-century Chilean male writers
21st-century Chilean historians
21st-century Chilean male writers
Candidates for President of Chile
Chilean essayists
Chilean people of Basque descent
Chilean people of French descent
Chilean political scientists
Heads of universities in Chile
Chilean sociologists
Living people
Politicians from Santiago
Pontifical Catholic University of Chile alumni
Université catholique de Louvain alumni
Members of the MAPU Obrero Campesino
Democratic Revolution politicians
Writers from Santiago